Oman participated in the 2010 Asian Para Games–First Asian Para Games in Guangzhou, China from 13 to 19 December 2010. Athletes from Oman competed in two events.

References

Nations at the 2010 Asian Para Games
2010 in Omani sport